Wickham Heath is a small hamlet in Berkshire, England, and part of the civil parish of Welford.

Hamlets in Berkshire
West Berkshire District